Pakistan International Airlines Flight 17 was a scheduled domestic flight from Dacca to Faridpur in East Pakistan (now Bangladesh) operated by a Sikorsky S-61 twin-engined helicopter of Pakistan International Airlines. On 2 February 1966 the helicopter operating the flight crashed near Fardipur after an oil leak developed and the main gearbox failed. Twenty passengers and all three crew were killed; one passenger survived.

Accident
The S-61, registered AP-AOC, left Dacca at 14:03 local time on 2 February 1966 and within 15 minutes an oil leak had started from a pipe connected to the main gearbox. The flight continued and while the helicopter was at an altitude of 500 feet (152 m) crossing the Padma River the sole survivor noticed that the oil leak was visible in the passenger cabin. About 3.5 miles (5.6 km) from Faridpur heliport, a bird strike occurred, with a vulture hitting one of the rotor blades on the left side of the helicopter. The helicopter continued normally and the pilot lowered its landing gear at an altitude of 300 feet (91 m) in preparation for the scheduled landing at Faridpur. Although both engines were running the helicopter experienced a loss of power to the main transmission; the pilot corrected the resulting turn to the left, then the helicopter continued rolling and rocking in a steep uncontrolled descent into the ground at 14:23.

Probable cause
The accident was attributed to the disengagement of the left and right spur gear teeth in the main transmission, caused by the load imposed by the failure of the gearbox's rear sleeve bearing journals. The rear sleeve bearing failure was caused by an oil leak although evidence was destroyed by fire and the source of the leak was not established.

References

Aviation accidents and incidents in Pakistan
Accidents and incidents involving the Sikorsky S-61
17
1966 in Pakistan
February 1966 events in Asia